Tyler Wright (born 31 March 1994) is an Australian professional surfer on the WSL World Tour.  She is a consecutive WSL Women's World Champion (2016, 2017).

Early life
Wright, who is from a close-knit surfing family,  grew up at Culburra Beach, a surf spot about two hours south of Sydney near Nowra. Her four siblings are Owen, Kirby, Mikey, and Tim. Her father, Rob, a passionate surfer, and her mother, Fiona, drive the whole family around Australia following the amateur scene.

Career
At the age of 14, Wright overtook a number of champions, some of whom were twice her age, to become the youngest-ever winner of a Championship Tour event, Layne Beachley's Beachley Classic in 2008. Wright joined the World Surf League Women's Championship Tour in 2011, and won World Titles in 2016 and 2017.

Media
Australian TV channel ABC featured her in its biographic documentary program Australian Story on national television in March 2017.

In 2018 she fell ill with chronic fatigue syndrome after influenza A.

Career victories

WSL World Championship Tour

References

External links
 
 

1994 births
Living people
People from the South Coast (New South Wales)
People from the Northern Rivers
Australian female surfers
World Surf League surfers
Sportswomen from New South Wales
People with chronic fatigue syndrome